Provo Canyon School (PCS) is a psychiatric youth residential treatment center, owned and operated by Universal Health Services (UHS) since 2000. The school uses an "Acuity Based Care" (ABC) model that identifies and re-assesses the strengths and needs of its students. Students receive a wide range of interventions including recreational and occupational therapies; individual, group, and art therapies; and substance abuse therapy.

For nearly its entire history, the facility has faced accusations of abuse. These accusations gained renewed attention in 2020 when media personality Paris Hilton released a documentary detailing the abuse she and other former residents faced at the facility.

Charter Behavioral Health Systems owned and operated PCS until it sold to UHS in 2000.

Education
PCS offers year round academics to all of its students. The school offers a variety of educational programs to the students including career counseling, competitive sports, special education and more. PCS is fully accredited by the Northwest Accreditation Commission.

Abuse

Since its inception, the school has been subject to a large number of individual and class-action lawsuits, particularly throughout the 1980s and 1990s. These lawsuits ranged from verbal, physical, and sexual abuse and medical negligence, to violating students' First Amendment rights and invasion of privacy, to false imprisonment and battery, to intentional infliction of emotional distress, civil conspiracy, and loss of parental consortium.

In September 2020, media personality and socialite Paris Hilton premiered her YouTube Originals documentary This Is Paris, in which she attributes her chronic insomnia to PTSD developed as a result of being sent to four different "troubled teen" industry programs: CEDU School in Running Springs, California, Ascent Wilderness Program in Ruby Ridge, Idaho, Cascade School in Whitmore, California, and Provo Canyon School. After running from the first three, she spent 11 months at PCS in the late 1990s. Hilton reported that she and other students were physically and psychologically abused. Some of the instances she details include how she and the other students were allegedly drugged with unknown medications, how she was allegedly restrained and forcibly transported to the school and how she was strip searched and placed in a seclusion room for nearly twenty-four hours. She claims PCS as "the worst of the worst" of all troubled youth facilities.

In October 2020, tattoo artist and television personality Kat Von D alleged her parents sent her to the school for a three-week program, but she was ultimately there for six months. She claimed to witness students being force-fed medications, sedated, and isolated. Von D said that she left with "major PTSD and other traumas due to the unregulated, unethical and abusive protocols of this 'school'" and wrote that she couldn't "call them schools because they're not schools they're fucking lockdown facilities". Von D said that she was "spared of the sexual abuse and the physical abuse" but "definitely saw" it happen.

On October 9, 2020, Hilton and a group of friends who attended PCS with her led a silent protest with hundreds of other protesters through the streets and neighborhoods of Provo, Utah to bring awareness to the facility.

References

External links

Private high schools in Utah
Provo, Utah
Springville, Utah
Behavior modification
Residential treatment centers
Medical controversies in the United States
Human rights abuses in the United States